The 2014 Arizona Wildcats football team represented the University of Arizona in the 2014 NCAA Division I FBS football season. The season was the Wildcats's 115th overall, 37th as a member of the Pac-12 Conference (Pac-12) and its fourth within the Pac-12 South Division. The team was led by head coach Rich Rodriguez, in his third year, and played its home games at Arizona Stadium in Tucson, Arizona for the 86th straight year.

They ultimately finished 10–4, achieving the second 10-win regular season in program history. The Wildcats won the Pac-12 South Division for the first time, advancing to the Pac-12 Football Championship Game at Levi's Stadium in Santa Clara, California, where they faced the Oregon Ducks. The Wildcats played in the first year of the New Year's Six bowls, netting a berth in the 2014 Fiesta Bowl, the school's third major-bowl appearance, where they faced the Boise State Broncos.  Arizona lost the game to Boise State, 38–30.

Previous season
The Arizona Wildcats finished the 2013 regular season with an (8–5, 4–5 Pac-12) record. They were invited to the 2013 AdvoCare V100 Bowl, where they faced the Boston College Eagles. The Wildcats defeated Boston College, 42-19.

Departures

Before the season

Top returning players

Offense

Defense

Special teams

Arrivals

Spring football
On April 12, 2014, Arizona capped off its spring football camp with a scrimmage at Arizona Stadium which was open to the public.

Recruiting class

Preseason awards watchlists

Overall awards

Offensive

Maxwell Award – College Football Player of the Year *Austin Hill

Walter Camp Award – Player of the Year *Austin Hill

Biletnikoff Award – College Football Player of the Year *Austin Hill

Defensive awards

Defensive

Bronko Nagurski Trophy – Most Outstanding Defensive Player *Jared Tevis

Regular season

Schedule

Personnel

Roster

Depth chart
Source:

On April 12, 2014, the Wildcats will play the White and Navy Blue game, the program's annual spring game. Arizona plays seven of twelve regular season games at home: two of three non-conference games and five of nine in Pac-12 play.  For the second-straight year the Cats face neither Stanford nor Oregon State.

Game summaries

UNLV Rebels

at UTSA Roadrunners

Nevada Wolfpack

California

In their first home conference game of the regular season the Wildcats faced off against Cal. The game became known for the "Hill Mary" play that ended and won the game for Arizona.

at #2 Oregon Ducks

USC Trojans (Family Weekend)

at Washington State Cougars

at #25 UCLA Bruins

Colorado Buffaloes (Homecoming game)

Washington Huskies

at #20 Utah Utes

#13 Arizona State Sun Devils (Territorial Cup)/(Senior night)

#3 Oregon Ducks (Pac-12 Championship Game)

#21 Boise State Broncos (2014 Fiesta Bowl)

Statistics

Team
{| class="wikitable collapsible collapsed"
! colspan="3"| Team Statistics 
|-
!   !! Arizona !! Opponents
|-
| Points || 440 || 306
|-
| First Downs || 307 || 284
|-
| Rushing || 110 || 101
|-
| Passing || 156 || 159
|-
| Penalty || 41 || 24
|-
| Rushing Yards || 2,278 || 1,914
|-
| Rushing Attempts || 484 || 493
|-
| Average Per Rush || 4.7 || 3.9
|-
| Long || 85 || 66
|-
| Rushing TDs || 23 || 12
|-
| Passing Yards || 3,497 || 3,302
|-
| Comp–Att || 283/488 || 298/459
|-
| Comp % || 58.0 || 64.9
|-
| Average Per Game || 291.4 || 275.2
|-
| Average per Attempt || 7.2  || 7.2
|-
| Passing TDs || 27 || 25
|-
| INT's || 7 || 12
|-
| Rating || 133.6 || 138.1
|-
| Touchdowns || 56 || 38
|-
| Passing || 25 || 21
|-
| Rushing || 20 || 12
|-
| Defensive || 2 || 0
|-
| Interceptions || 12 || 7
|-
| Yards || 107 || 40
|-
| Long || 39 || 22
|-
| Total Offense || 5,775 || 5,216
|-
| Total Plays || 972 || 952
|-
| Average Per Yards/Game || 481.3 || 434.7
|-
| Kick Returns: # – Yards || 25/499 || 33/615
|-
| TDs || 1 || 0
|-
| Long || 44 || 34
|-
| Punts || 63 || 71
|-
| Yards || 2,904 || 2,985
|-
| Average || 46.1 || 42.0
|-
| Punt Returns: # – Yards || 16/172 || 23/192
|-
| TDs || 1 || 0
|-
| Long || 81 || 34
|-
| Fumbles – Fumbles Lost || 13/7|| 28/12
|-
| Opposing TD's || 3 || 1
|-
| Penalties – Yards || 78/759 || 105/930|-
| 3rd–Down Conversions || 79/197 - .401 || 80/200 - .400|-
| 4th–Down Conversions || 14/21 - .667 || 7/17 - .412|-
| Takeaways || 24 || 14|-
| Field Goals || 17/25 || 13/19|-
| Extra Point || 53/53 || 35/36|-
| Sacks || 38 || 28|-
| Sack Against || 28 || 38
|-
| Yards || -166 || -221
|-
|}

Offense

Defense

Special teams

Scores by quarter (all opponents)

Scores by quarter (Pac-12 opponents)

Rankings

Postseason

Awards

Pac-12 Conference AwardsDefensive Player of the YearScooby Wright IIICoach of the YearRich Rodriguez

Reference:

Team Awards

 Chuck Bednarik Award : Scooby Wright III 

 Bronko Nagurski Trophy – Most Outstanding Defensive Player : Scooby Wright III

 Lombardi Award : Scooby Wright III

Reference:

All-American Teams

All-AmericansScooby Wright III SI.com 2014 Midseason All-American Team
 2014 College Football All American (Associated Press (AP), Football Writers Association of America (FWAA), American Football Coaches Association (AFCA), Walter Camp Foundation (WCFF), The Sporting News (TSN), Sports Illustrated (SI), USA Today (USAT) ESPN, CBS Sports (CBS), College Football News (CFN), Scout.com, and Yahoo! Sports (Yahoo!))

Pac-12 All-Conference Team
The Wildcats saw 10 of its players honored as members of the 2014 Pac-12 All-Conference team. The first team had one such honoree, while the second team had two. Seven other Cats would land Honorable Mention status.First TeamScooby Wright III, LB, So.Second TeamSteven Gurrola, OL, Sr.
Drew Riggleman, P, Jr.Honorable MentionAustin Hill, WR, Sr.
Cayleb Jones, WR, So.
Jonathan McKnight, CB, Sr.
Dan Pettinato, DE, Sr.
Anu Solomon, QB, Fr.
Jared Tevis, S, Sr.
Nick Wilson, RB, Fr.

All-Academic Teams

NCAA Academic All-Americans

Pac-12 Conference All-Academic Players
The Wildcats had six players selected to the Pac-12 Conference All-Academic Team. One player garnered first team honors, while two players landed on the second team, the Wildcats had 3 players granted honorable mention. In order to be eligible for the academic team a player must maintain a minimum 3.0 overall grade-point average and play in at least 50 percent of their team's games.First TeamJared Tevis, S, Sr., 3.28 GPASecond TeamJared Baker, RB, Jr., 3.30 GPA
Jake Matthews, LB, So., 3.55 GPAHonorable MentionCalvin Allen, DE, Fr., 3.23 GPA 
Abraham Mendivil, WR, Fr., 3.29 GPA
Casey Skowron, PK, Jr., 3.37 GPA
Reference:

Records Broken

Player of the WeekAnu Solomon 2x Coaches Offensive Player of the Week
 Manning Award of the Week, Sept. 2nd
 Athlon Sports' National Freshman of the Week
 Davey O'Brien QB of the Week, Sept. 23rd
 Athlon Sports' Pac12 Player of the Week
 Manning Award Star of the Week
 Vegas Seven- Las Vegas Bowl Pac-12 Player of the Week, Sept. 24th
 Maxwell Award Watchlist
 Hard Edge Player of the WeekCayleb Jones Pac-12 Player of the Week, Sept. 22nd 
 Coaches Offensive Player of the Week
 Co-CFPA Wide Receivers of the Week
 Earl Campbell Award Week 4 Honorable mention
 Biletnikoff Award Watch ListTerris Jones-Grigsby Coaches Offensive Player of the WeekAustin Hill Co-CFPA Wide Receivers of the WeekSamajie Grant Coaches Offensive Player of the WeekNate Phillips Hard Edge Player of the WeekNick Wilson 4x Coaches Offensive Player of the Week
 Pac-12 Offensive Player of the WeekSteven Gurrola Coaches Co-Hard Edge Player of the WeekParker Zellers Coaches Co-Hard Edge Player of the WeekDan Pettinato Coaches Defensive Player of the WeekJared Tevis 2x Coaches Defensive Player of the Week 
 2x Hard Edge Player of the WeekScooby Wright III 3x Pac-12 Defensive Player of the Week
 5x Coaches Defensive Player of the Week
 Hard Edge Player of the Week
 Athlon Sports' National Defensive Player of the Week
 National Defensive Performer of the Week
 National Linebacker of the Week
 2x Walter Camp National Defensive Player of the Week
 Bednarik Award watchlistDavonte' Neal Coaches Special Teams Player of the WeekTyrell Johnson Coaches Special Teams Player of the WeekJourdon Grandon Coaches Defensive Player of the WeekDrew Riggleman 2x Coaches Special Teams Player of the Week
 Pac-12 Special Teams Player of the WeekCasey Skowron'''
 3x Coaches Special Teams Player of the Week
 Lou Groza Award Stars of the Week
 National Specialist of the Week by CFPA, Sept. 8th

Notes
February 5, 2014 – National Signing Day, first day when high school students can sign a NLI with Arizona.
November 11, 2014 – All American WR Nate Phillips is done for remainder of the season with broken foot injury.

Media affiliates

Radio

ESPN Radio – (ESPN Tucson 1490 AM & 104.09 FM) – Nationwide (Dish Network, Sirius XM, TuneIn radio and iHeartRadio)
KCUB 1290 AM – Football Radio Show – (Tucson, AZ)
KHYT – 107.5 FM (Tucson, AZ)
KTKT 990 AM  – La Hora de Los Gatos (Spanish)'' – (Tucson, AZ)
KGME 910 AM – (IMG Sports Network) – (Phoenix, AZ)
KTAN 1420 AM – (Sierra Vista, AZ)
KDAP 96.5 FM (Douglas, Arizona)
KWRQ 102.3 FM – (Safford, AZ/Thatcher, AZ)
KIKO 1340 AM – (Globe, AZ)
KVWM 970 AM – (Show Low, AZ/Pinetop-Lakeside, AZ)
XENY 760 – (Nogales, Sonora) (Spanish)

TV
KOLD  (CBS)
KGUN (ESPN College Football on ABC/ABC)
FOX (Fox Sports Media Group)
FS1 (Fox Sports Media Group) 
ESPN (ESPN Family)
ESPN2 (ESPN Family)
ESPNU (ESPN Family)
CBS Sports Network
Pac-12 Network (Pac-12 Arizona)

References

Arizona
Arizona Wildcats football seasons
2014 in sports in Arizona